The Greenland cod (Gadus ogac), commonly known also as ogac, is a species of ray-finned fish in the cod family, Gadidae. Genetic analysis has shown that it may be the same species as the Pacific cod (Gadus macrocephalus). It is a bottom-dwelling fish and is found on the continental shelf in the Arctic Ocean and northwestern Atlantic Ocean, its range extending from Alaska to West Greenland, then southwards along the Canadian coast to the Gulf of St. Lawrence and Cape Breton Island. It is a commercially harvested food fish, but landings have been greatly reduced in recent years.

Taxonomy
Molecular genetic analyses strongly suggest that Greenland cod is not different from Pacific cod, Gadus macrocephalus - Gadus ogac is then a junior synonym of G. macrocephalus. ITIS and the Catalogue of Life list Gadus ogac as synonym of G. macrocephalus.

Description
In colour the Greenland cod is generally sombre, ranging from tan to brown to silvery. Its appearance is similar to that of other cod species; generally heavy-bodied, elongate, usually with a stout caudal peduncle. They can grow to a length of 77 cm.

They are bottom fishes inhabiting inshore waters and continental shelves, up to depths of 200 m. Their range covers the Arctic Ocean and Northwest Atlantic Ocean from Alaska to West Greenland, then south along the Canadian coast to the Gulf of St. Lawrence and Cape Breton Island generally from 45 to 75 degrees north.

Their wholesome flesh is whitish and flaky but firmer and tougher and less desirable than that of the Atlantic cod. The stock of Greenland cod has been strongly reduced in recent years.

Fisheries

References

Further reading
 Hamilton LC, Brown BC and Rasmussen RO (2003) "West Greenland’s Cod-to-Shrimp Transition: Local Dimensions of Climatic Change" Arctic, 56 (3): 271–282.
 Roe P (2012) "Growth variability in Atlantic cod (Gadus morhua) near its northern range of distribution" Master thesis, Aarhus University.
 Therkildsen NO, Hemmer‐Hansen J, Wisz MS, Pampoulie C, Meldrup D, Bonanomi S, Retze A, Olsen SM and Nielsen EE (2013) "Spatiotemporal SNP analysis reveals pronounced biocomplexity at the northern range margin of Atlantic cod Gadus morhua" Evolutionary Applications, 6 (4): 690–705.

External links
 DNA test rewrites history of Greenland cod ScienceNordic, 30 March 2013.

Gadus
Fish of the Arctic Ocean
Greenlandic cuisine
Fish described in 1836